This is a list of films which have reached number one at the weekend box office in Taipei, Taiwan during 2019.

Films

See also 
 List of highest-grossing films in Taiwan

References

External links 
Taipei Weekend Box Office Chart for 2019 @movies

2019
Taipei
2019 in Taiwan